The Southeastern Papuan rain forests is a tropical moist forest ecoregion in southeastern New Guinea. The ecoregion covers the mountainous center and coastal lowlands of the Papuan Peninsula.

Geography
The mountains that run the length of the peninsula are the eastern extension of the mountainous spine that runs the length of New Guinea. The Owen Stanley Range includes Mount Victoria (4,038 m), the ecoregion's highest peak .

Climate
The climate of the ecoregion varies with altitude. The lowlands are humid and tropical. Average temperatures decrease with altitude, and the highest portions of the Owen Stanley Range experience regular freezing temperatures.

Flora
The ecoregion's natural vegetation is humid evergreen rain forests. The forest types include alluvial rain forest on lowland plains, hill forests at the foot of the mountains, montane forests above 1000 meters, upper montane forests, and high mountain forests below the tree line. The highest peaks of the Owen Stanley Range are home to sub-alpine grasslands and shrublands, which are included in the separate Central Range sub-alpine grasslands ecoregion.

Fauna
There are 138 species of mammals in the ecoregion, mostly marsupials, bats, and murid rodents. Seven mammal species are endemic: broad-striped dasyure (Paramurexia rothschildi), giant bandicoot (Peroryctes broadbenti), Papuan bandicoot (Microperoryctes papuensis), New Guinea big-eared bat (Pharotis imogene), Chiruromys lamia, Long-nosed mosaic-tailed rat (Melomys levipes), and Van Deusen's rat (Rattus vandeuseni).

The ecoregion is home to 510 species of birds. The largest bird in the ecoregion is the flightless southern cassowary (Casuarius casuarius), which lives in the lowland forests. Four species are endemic to the ecoregion – the brown-headed paradise kingfisher (Tanysiptera danae), grey-headed munia (Lonchura caniceps), streaked bowerbird (Amblyornis subalaris), and eastern parotia (Parotia helenae).

Protected areas 
A 2017 assessment found that 830 km², or 1%, of the ecoregion is in protected areas. Over 80% of the ecoregion is still forested.

External links

References 

Australasian ecoregions
Ecoregions of New Guinea
Ecoregions of Papua New Guinea
Montane forests
Tropical and subtropical moist broadleaf forests